The Gulf Coast Archive and Museum of Gay, Lesbian, Bisexual and Transgender History, Inc. (GCAM) is an LGBT history organization located in Houston. It was previously in Neartown.

GCAM was created to collect, preserve and provide access to historical items from the LGBT community of the Gulf Coast area of Texas.
The archive encourages education of and research by anyone interested in learning about any aspects of the LGBT community.  The organization sponsors meetings for the dissemination of information and display of collected materials.

History
GCAM began meeting in July 1999 and officially incorporated in May 2000.  The initial opening of the museum doors occurred Friday, June 16, 2000, in a small shared warehouse space on Capitol Street.

By June 2001, the museum had moved into an apartment on West Main Street.

In May 2005, GCAM officially closed its museum to focus on preserving the history of the community.

Later, GCAM moved into an office at the Montrose Center with an ongoing exhibit space there on the public walls of the space.

 the organization's archives are available for viewing by appointment. The museum is now closed.

Exhibits
June through September 2004, GCAM was proud to be able to assist the Holocaust Museum Houston to present Nazi Persecution of Homosexuals 1933–1945.

See also

ONE National Gay & Lesbian Archives – LGBT Archive based in Los Angeles
Houston Gay and Lesbian Film Festival
LGBT rights in Texas

References

External links 
Gulf Coast Archive and Museum of GLBT History, Inc. — official website

"Museum Shares History of Diversity", Houston Chronicle, June 30, 2002
"To Life – World AIDS Day", OutSmart Magazine, November 2003
"Museum on a mission to save local gay history / Collection shows long fight to gain rights in Houston", Houston Chronicle, August 24, 2004
"Finding Jade", OutSmart Magazine, June 2005
"Houston Area Rainbow Collective History (Houston ARCH)"

LGBT museums and archives
Archives in the United States
Historiography of LGBT in the United States
LGBT culture in Houston
Defunct museums in Texas